The  is the name given to rapid services on the eastern section of the Chūō Main Line operated by the East Japan Railway Company (JR East) between  and  stations. The official map shows services travel as far as Otsuki.

Basic data
Operator: East Japan Railway Company (Services and tracks)
Tokyo – Takao: 
Double-tracked section: Entire line
Railway signalling: ATS
CTC center: Tokyo Operations Control Center

History

Most of the route of the Chūō Line (Rapid) was built by the Kōbu Railway and later acquired by the Japanese Government Railways in 1906.

Operation of electric multiple unit (EMU) trains on the Chūō Main Line began in 1904. By 1930, the EMU service had reached Tokyo to the east and Asakawa (now Takao) to the west. In 1933, two tracks were added to the existing double-tracked section between Ochanomizu and Iidamachi stations (later closed) to complete the four-track line between Ochanomizu and Nakano. On these additional tracks, which skipped all stations except Yotsuya and Shinjuku, were introduced the same year. The express service was renamed  service in March 1961.

Initially, the operation of express/rapid services was limited to weekday peak periods only. Express service began on weekends on March 5, 1944; daytime non-peak operation began on November 9, 1959, but it was limited to weekdays only until April 28, 1966. All day rapid service trains are available since March 14, 2020, when early morning and late night rapid operations began.

Manseibashi Station, located between Kanda and Ochanomizu, was closed in 1943. On the section east of Takao, only Nishi-Kokubunji Station (opened in 1973) and Nishi-Hachiōji Station (opened in 1939) were opened after the start of rapid services.

20 August 1979: 201 series EMUs introduced
16 March 1991: Ohayō Liner Takao/Ōme and Home Liner Takao/Ōme begin operation
10 April 1993: Kokubunji Station added to Ōme Special Rapid stops; Commuter Special Rapid begins operation
1 December 1997: Chūō Main Line-bound 115 series EMUs no longer service Shinjuku Station
5 October 2005: Women-only cars introduced
26 December 2006: E233 series EMUs introduced
20 August 2016: Station numbering introduced with stations being assigned station numbers between JC01 (Tokyo) and JC24 (Takao).
16 March 2019: 209-1000 series EMUs commence service.
11 March 2022: Through services to the Hachikō Line and Itsukaichi Line (except Holiday Rapid services) end.

Future developments
JR East plans to introduce Green (first class) cars on Chūō Line (Rapid) and Ome Line services from fiscal 2021 or later. This will involve adding two bilevel Green cars to 10-car and 6-car E233 series EMU sets, forming 12-car and 8-car sets. Work will be involved in lengthening station platforms and depot facilities to handle the longer trains. In order to compensate the insufficient train sets for regular operations due to existing sets to be undergoing green car addition modifications, two 209-1000 series train sets originally used on the Jōban Line (Local) have been transferred to the Chūō Line. These sets commenced service from 16 March 2019.

JR East announced that the Rapid Holiday Akigawa will be abolished effective the timetable revision on 18 March 2023. Effective on the same day, the direct service on Rapid Holiday Okutama services towards Shinjuku will be truncated at Okutama.

Suicides
The Chūō Rapid Line is known for a high number of suicides, primarily due to the high speed at which some trains pass through stations on the line.

Services

Although the Chūō Line (Rapid) designation only refers to the section between Tokyo and Takao stations, many trains continue on past Takao to Ōtsuki, with some trains operating through services to other lines. These include both limited express and various special rapid services. For details, see the Chūō Main Line article. In addition, Chūō Line (Rapid) trains do not stop at some stations between Ochanomizu and Nakano stations; for information on those services, see the Chūō-Sōbu Line article.

The Chūō Line (Rapid) uses the two express tracks on the four-track section between Ochanomizu and Mitaka stations. Past Mitaka, trains use both tracks on the remaining double-track section. Since the express tracks do not have platforms at several stations in central Tokyo, even the slowest services of the Chūō Line (Rapid) skip such stations and are therefore called . In addition to the basic type of "Rapid", there are some variations of the service types with fewer stops.

Rapid (快速)

This service is the most common on the Chūō Line (Rapid) route. After Nakano, it stops at Shinjuku, Yotsuya, Ochanomizu, and Kanda stations before arrival in Tōkyō Terminal.
They run between Tokyo on the east side, and Takao/Otsuki on the west side, though some westbound services terminate at stations before Takao, such as Musashi-Koganei, Tachikawa, Toyoda and Hachioji.
Some trains operate through services to the Ōme Line (to as far as Ōme/from Okutama) or the Fuji Kyuko Line (to/from Kawguchiko, via Ōtsuki).
The service's signature color on service diagrams is orange (■).

Chūō Special Rapid (中央特快) Ōme Special Rapid (青梅特快)

These two services stop at the same stations that Rapid services would stop between Tokyo and Nakano. After Nakano, these services only stop at Mitaka, Kokubunji and Tachikawa, and stop at all stations west of Tachikawa. Eastbound services continue from Nakano as a rapid service.
Chūō Special Rapid stays on the Chūō Main Line to Takao and Ōtsuki, and some services operate beyond Ōtsuki to the Fuji Kyuko Line towards Kawaguchiko.
Ōme Special Rapid spurs to the Ōme Line towards Ōme, stopping at all stations within the line. 
The service's signature color on service diagrams is blue (■) for Chūō Special Rapid and green (■) for Ōme Special Rapid.

Commuter Rapid (通勤快速)

Commuter Rapid services operates weekday evening. It starts service in Tokyo heading west, and stops at Ogikubo and Kichijōji in addition to the stops of the two Special Rapids. They mostly terminate at Takao, though a few trains go further to Ōtsuki, or operate through services to Kawaguchiko on the Fuji Kyuko Line, or to Ōme on the Ōme Line. Again, through services to the Ōme Line or the Fuji Kyuko Line stops at all stations on their respective lines.
The service's signature color on service diagrams is purple (■).

Commuter Special Rapid (通勤特快)

This service only operates on weekday towards Tokyo, where two originates from Ōtsuki, two from Ōme on the Ōme Line, and one from Takao. It stops at all stations until Takao, Hachiōji, Tachikawa, Kokubunji, and Shinjuku and continues as a rapid service from Shinjuku. Again, services from Ōme stop at all stations on the Ōme Line.
The service's signature color on service diagrams is pink (■).

Musashino (むさしの号)

The Musashino is a local service train linking  to  via the Musashino Line.

Holiday Rapid (ホリデー快速)
A variety of Holiday Rapid services running on the Chūō Rapid Line operate during the weekends and holidays to serve passengers.

The Holiday Rapid Okutama (ホリデー快速おくたま), which runs through the Ōme Line, and Holiday Rapid Akigawa (ホリデー快速あきがわ), which runs through the Itsukaichi Line, are two of them. They couple together, running through the Chūō Rapid Line, from Tokyo / Shinjuku to Tachikawa, through the Ōme Line to Haijima, and decouple. The former heads to Okutama, and the latter heads to Musashi-Itsukaichi.
The Holiday Rapid Mount Fuji (ホリデー快速富士山) and Holiday Rapid View Yamanashi (ホリデー快速ビューやまなし) are two holiday rapid services that, though nominally called 'Rapid', they stop at stations not less than the Special Rapids (Stops at Shinjuku, Mitaka, Tachikawa, Hachiōji, Takao within the Chūō Rapid Line, and skips stations such as Nakano, Kokubunji, Hino, Toyoda, Nishi-Hachiōji, and also some stations west of Takao.)

Former Service

Local (各駅停車)

They ran between Tokyo on the east side and as far as Takao on the west side, though, like Rapid services, some westbound services terminate at stations before Takao, such as Musashi-Koganei, Tachikawa, Toyoda and Hachioji. A few services operated through services to Ōme on the Ōme Line. 
The service's signature color on service diagrams is yellow (■). 
To prepare for the installation of platform doors on the Chūō-Sōbu Line platforms and the future addition of Green Cars, Rapid service trains ceased to operate on the Chūō-Sōbu Line tracks after 13 March 2020. Chūō-Sōbu Line local trains will no longer turn around at Ochanomizu during early morning and late night hours.

Itsukaichi Line and Hachikō Line through services
With the exception of the Holiday Rapid Akigawa, through services to the Itsukaichi Line (to/from Musashi-Itsukaichi, via Haijima on the Ōme Line) and Hachikō Line (to/from as far as Komagawa, via Haijima on the Ōme Line) operated until 11 March 2022.

Station list 

 This list will include stations from Tokyo to Ōtsuki, where most train services on this line serve.
 For information on local services, please see the Chūō-Sōbu Line article.
 For information on the Chūō Line west of Otsuki, please see the Chūō Main Line article.
 Information on the limited expresses Azusa, Kaiji, Narita Express, Fuji Excursion, Hachiōji, Ōme and seasonal trains can be found on their respective pages.

 Legend
 ● : All trains stop 
 ｜: All trains pass (↑ ↓ : Indicates the direction of trains passing)
▲: Stop, eastbound only
▼: Stop. westbound only
 ◆: All trains pass on weekends and holidays

Rolling stock
Rapid・Commuter Special Rapid・Chūō Special Rapid・Ōme Special Rapid ・Commuter Rapid
 E233 series (from 26 December 2006)
209-1000 series x2 sets (from 16 March 2019)

Former rolling stock
  72 series
 101 series (25 December 1957-13 March 1985)
 103 series (1973-1983)
 201 series (20 August 1979-16 October 2010)

Chūō Liner / Ōme Liner
 183 series (March 14, 1991 - March 14, 2008)
E351 series 12-car EMUs (March 15, 2008 - March 16, 2018).

References

External links

 East Japan Railway Company (JR East) Official Website 

Chūō Main Line
1067 mm gauge railways in Japan